Indian Creek is a stream in Bollinger County in the U.S. state of Missouri. It is a tributary of Crooked Creek.

Indian Creek was named for the fact traces of Indian settlement were found along its course.

See also
List of rivers of Missouri

References

Rivers of Bollinger County, Missouri
Rivers of Missouri